The third-generation Chevrolet Camaro is an American pony car which was introduced for the 1982 model year by Chevrolet. It continued to use General Motors' F-body platform and produced a "20th Anniversary Commemorative Edition" for 1987 and "25th Anniversary Heritage Edition" for 1992. These were also the first Camaros with factory fuel injection, four-speed automatic transmissions, five-speed manual transmissions, four-cylinder engines, 16-inch wheels, and hatchback bodies. For 1987 a convertible Camaro was reintroduced, converted by ASC in relatively small numbers. The third-generation Camaro continued through the 1992 model year.

Design 
The Camaro's design owed nothing to previous generations. The large and complex rear window reflected recent advances in car glass design. The front windshield reclined at 62 degrees, thus breaking an internal GM rule limiting such angles to sixty degrees. The rear seat folded down to expand the luggage compartment, which was accessed through a large rear hatch.

1982 
The Third-Generation Camaro was released for sale in December 1981, beginning production on October 12, 1981. The 1982 model introduced the first Camaros with a hatchback body style, and such options as factory fuel injection, and a four-cylinder engine. The Camaro Z28 was Motor Trend magazine's Car of the Year for 1982. Three models were available: Sport Coupe, Berlinetta, and Z28. 173,000 Camaros were sold in the United States in 1982. 12 percent of buyers took the four-cylinder, 37 percent the V6, while 51 percent opted for the V8.

The Sport Coupe came standard with the  LQ9 four-cylinder engine. The  LC1 V6 and the  LG4 V8 were optional. Dog dish-style hubcaps were standard; full wheel covers were optional as were steel, five-spoke 14x7-inch body-colored rally wheels.

The Berlinetta came with the standard 2.8 LC1 V6 or the optional 5.0 LG4 V8. This package also sported unique 14x7-inch finned aluminum wheel with gold accenting and a 'Berlinetta' center cap. Its own lower-body pinstriping, gold 'Berlinetta' badging, and headlamp pockets were painted in an accent color. The taillights got a gold and black horizontal divider bar. The interior came standard with custom cloth interior, a rear storage well cover, and additional carpeting on rear wheelhouses. It also came standard with additional body insulation and full instrumentation.

The new Camaro received positive reviews for its styling and handling, but was also criticized for the low power ratings for the Camaro Z28.

The Z28s included lightweight fiberglass SMC hoods with functional hood air induction flaps on RPO LU5 cars. The Z28 had a different nose, a three-piece rear spoiler and front, side, as well as rear lower body valances in silver or gold. Just above the valance was a three-color lower body stripe that encircled the car. Headlamp pockets on the Z28 were black. Standard were new 15x7-inch cast-aluminum five-spoke wheels accented with silver or gold. Z28 badges appeared on the right rear bumper and on the side valances. On early models, if the "Conteur" sport seats were selected as an option, the passenger seat was purposefully a mismatched high-back bucket seat design, due to production shortages of the passenger seat.

The Camaro Z28 was the pace car for the 1982 Indianapolis 500 race, and over 6,000 appearance replicas were sold through Chevrolet dealers. The edition featured special two-tone silver/blue paint and special striping, orange pin-striping on  Z28 wheels, and a silver/blue interior with six-way Lear-Seigler manually adjustable seating. Engine choices in the pace cars were the same as the regular production Z28. The car that actually paced the event was equipped with a highly-modified, all-aluminum 5.7 L V8 that was not available on the replica cars.

At the 1982 Geneva Motor Show, a special European specification version was shown, the Camaro Z28E. The "E" stood for "Export" and it received British National Type Approval in 1982. The Z28E received the  DIN carburetted 5-liter V8, while the  2.8-liter V6 was soon added to the lineup.

1983 

The Z28 engines were changed for 1983: the LU5 Crossfire 305 V8 was rated at 175 hp and was supplemented in April 1983 by an all-new 5.0 L L69 4 bbl  High-Output (HO) V8. This engine was only available with a manual transmission in 1983. Due to its late introduction, 3,223 L69 V8s were sold for the 1983 model year.

Transmissions were upgraded for 1983. A Borg-Warner 5-speed manual transmission replaced the previous 4-speed. A 4-speed automatic transmission with overdrive replaced the 3-speed automatic transmission in the Z28. The TH700-R4 automatic overdrive was also available on the base coupe and Berlinetta, but was not available with the L69 H.O. engine in the Z28 for 1983. Aside from the new transmissions, base coupe and Berlinetta carried on as in 1982 with very little change other than newly available colors.

1984 
The dashboard pad on all models received a revised shape and finish. In the Berlinetta, the standard instrument cluster was replaced by electronic readouts, including a bar-graph tachometer and digital speedometer. The new dash came with an overhead console and pod-mounted controls for turn signals, cruise-control, HVAC, windshield wiper, and headlights. The radio was mounted inside a pod on the console that could swivel toward the driver or passenger.

Drivetrain changes included the discontinuation of the LU5 305 Cross Fire V8, and the addition of a hydraulic clutch linkage on manual transmission cars. The L69 H.O. Z28 became available with an automatic transmission for the first time.

The Z28's body and features remained mostly unchanged, except the fiberglass SMC hood was replaced with a steel version.

Road & Track selected the 1984 Camaro/Firebird as one of twelve best cars in the world and in the Best Sports GT category in the $11,000 to $14,000 range. Car and Driver picked the 1984 Camaro Z28 as the best handling car built in the United States.

1985 

For 1985, Chevrolet introduced the IROC-Z version that was named after the International Race of Champions. Offered as an option package on the Z28, the Camaro IROC-Z featured an upgraded suspension, lowered ride height, specially valved Delco-Bilstein shocks, larger diameter sway bars, a steering/frame brace known as the "wonder bar", a special decal package, and an optional Tuned Port Injection system taken from the Chevrolet Corvette. It also shared the Corvette's Goodyear "Gatorback" unidirectional tires in a 245/50/VR16 size vs. the Corvette's 255/50/VR16 size, and received unique new aluminum 5-spoke 16-by-8-inch wheels. The new wheels were designed with different offsets front and rear, resulting in the words "Front" or "Rear" cast into the wheels to distinguish which wheel went where.

The Camaro IROC-Z was on Car and Driver magazine's Ten Best list for 1985. A total of 2,497 L69 IROC-Z models were made for 1985. The LB9 was available only on the Z28 and the IROC-Z model with the TH700-R4 automatic transmission. A total of 205 IROC-Zs equipped with the LB9 305 with the G92 (Performance Axle Ratio) option were made in 1985. The G92 option upgraded the rear axle gear ratio from 3.23 to 3.42.

Also new for 1985, all Camaros featured refreshed noses, and new deeper valances and front spoiler for the Z28 and the newly introduced IROC-Z. The speedometers no longer had the unique double-pointed needle that simultaneously read mph and km/h: they were replaced by conventional single-pointer  units.

For 1985 a (1C5) RPO California IROC-Z was also made, Chevrolet's California Marketing Group came up with the idea and it was for sale in California only. A total of 250 black and 250 red examples were produced. They were all equipped with the 5.0 TPI LB9 engine and TH700-R4 automatic transmission. All came equipped with the IROC-Z fog lights, wheels and ground effects, but with the base Camaro's hood (no louvers), rear decklid (no spoiler), and no exterior decals.

1986 

A newly required Center High Mounted Stop Lamp (CHMSL) was installed on the Camaro. 1986 was the only year to see this attached to the outside hatchback glass on base model Sport Coupes, Z28s, and IROC-Zs except for 1987 base models that did not have a spoiler. This was the final year for the L69 5.0 305 HO 4-bbl option, of which 63 were built for racing in Canada's Player's series and 11 for public sale, making a total of 74. The 2.8 L V6 was now the standard engine in the base model, replacing the 2.5 L I-4 model. All V8 engines received a new one-piece rear main seal. Braking performance was 139 feet from 60mph. 1986 would be the final year for the Berlinetta trim level.

1987 

The 350 TPI engine with automatic and 305 TPI with 5-speed manual transmission were available for the first time in the IROC-Z. The new 350 (RPO code L98) was available only in the IROC-Z with an automatic transmission. The TPI 350 motor was visually distinguishable from the TPI 305 as the bumper cover decal had "5.7L" added to the "Tuned Port Injection" decal. It can also be determined by checking the VIN (8th character, F=305, 8=350). The 305 TPI equipped with automatic transmission came with 190 hp, while the Manual 305 TPI got a  rating. The 350 L98 gave a boost to 225 hp at 4,400 and 330ftlb at 2,800. All V8 engines received hydraulic roller lifters and a new valve cover/head design. Valve covers featured new sealing and center bolts in the valve covers. Heads featured a new raised lip for improved valve cover sealing and the two center intake bolts were changed from 90-degree orientation to 72 degrees. G92 and L98 cars got the Borg-Warner HD  four pinion rear end, produced for GM's Holden of Australia (Firebird WS6 cars went to this unit in 1986). These units can be identified by their 9 bolt (rather than 10) differential cover that has a rubber drain plug. The Borg-Warner logo is also cast into the bottom of the differential case. This rear axle came with tapered rather than straight roller bearings and a cone-clutch rather than disc-clutch limited-slip unit. These units came painted black from the factory while most others were bare metal. All 1987 350 TPI L98 IROC-Zs required 3.27 gears, J65 rear disc brakes, G80 limited-slip differential, and a KC4 engine oil cooler.

The largest visual change this year was the CHMSL (third brake light) was now mounted inside the rear spoiler instead of on top of the rear hatch (except the base coupe without the spoiler option - on those cars it remained on top of the hatch like the previous year). The Berlinetta was no longer available this year, replaced with a new LT model, while the base Camaro and Z28 continued as before.  speedometers became standard in the IROC-Zs and Z28s with tuned port injected engines while the carbureted Camaro models and 2.8 liter V6 retained the 85 m.p.h. speedometer.

Other changes included a Camaro convertible that was introduced for the first time since 1969 as a regular production option. Available on the Sport Coupe, LT and IROC-Z, the conversion was performed on t-top equipped Camaros by American Sunroof Company (ASC). A total of 1,007 were produced in the first year of production. The 1987 model year marked the 20th anniversary of the Camaro and the convertibles were considered the anniversary editions and included a dash badge that read "20th Anniversary Commemorative Edition". Some 1987 T-Top models were made into convertibles by ASC after the customer took delivery. This is why there are some convertibles with the body VIN code of 2, meaning they were coupes, not convertibles (which have a body VIN code of 3). This was also the last year of production at GM's Norwood, Ohio, facility as sales continued to decline consolidating Camaro assembly to the Van Nuys factory located in Southern California.

1988 

The Camaro line was greatly simplified this year, starting with discontinuing the slow-selling LT model, and dropping the base Z28. The IROC-Z package proved popular and the package became standard on Z28s. This resulted in two models remaining, the base coupe and the IROC-Z. Without the Z28 to bridge the gap between the base Camaro and the flagship IROC-Z, the previously standard aluminum 16-inch 5-spoke wheels were now an option - "base" IROCs now got the previous year Z28's aluminum 15-inch 5-spoke wheels (which also became standard on the base coupes) and P215/65-15 tires. Also, the old Z28's ground effects and spoilers were now standard on the base Camaro coupes. Base models received a new raised spoiler for the first half production year.

All engines were fuel-injected this year; the 2.8 (173) running 135 HP at 4,900 rpm and 160 lb.ft at 3,900 rpm, the 5.0L 305 cid V8 gained throttle-body injection, bringing net horsepower to 170; the 305 cid TPI manual transmission models were rated at 220 HP at 4,400 rpm and 290 lb.ft at 3,200 rpm, Automatic at 195 HP at 4,000 rpm and 290 lb.ft at 2,800 rpm and the 350 cid TPI got a small boost to 230 HP at 4,400 rpm and 330 lb.ft at 3,200 rpm. G92 (performance axle ratio) available only on IROC-Z with 5.0 TPI (LB9). All 1987 350 TPI L98 IROC-Zs came standard with the 3.27 BW rear end and everything that was included with G92 but did not have the G92 RPO code because it was not mandatory; this changed in 1988 however when a 2.77 rear was standard and G92 had to be specified to get the 3.27 differential. The IROC-Z was also treated to some small cosmetic changes. The "Z28" logos on the ground effects below the doors and on the rear bumper changed to read "IROC-Z". The large IROC-Z call-outs on the door moved from the front of the doors to the back, to put some space between the logos. Option code DX3 offered buyers the option of deleting the IROC-Z's door decals and stripes for a $60.00 credit. Optional 16-inch aluminum wheels were redesigned with two lines instead of one large line in each spoke, and center caps backgrounds changed from black to silver. Dash badges on the IROC still read "Z28" on top and "IROC-Z" below.
The VIN code 8 is the engine code for a real TPI 5.7L IROC.

1989 

The 1989 model year signified the return of the RS designation (last used in 1987 on a limited-edition California only model). The Rally Sport was now the base model featuring body ground effects mimicking the IROC and the previous Z28 but with the 2.8 V6 fuel-injected engine as standard with the 305 as an option. The raised rear spoiler that became available in 1988 on the base coupes was short-lived and done away with for this year. The engine ratings carried over from '88 with the addition of IROC-Z Coupes had a new dual catalytic converter exhaust option N10 that was standard with the G92 option only available on the 305 TPI motor with a manual transmission and the 350 TPI only available with the TH700-R4 automatic. 1989 was also the last year any third-gen with the B2L RPO 350 TPI L98 engine could be ordered in combination with the CC1 RPO removable T-Top roof panels.

Power ratings also varied in the 305 from 170 hp (standard RPO L03) to 230 hp (RPO LB9 with manual transmission and RPO N10 dual catalytic converter exhaust) and a boost to 240 hp for the 350 with RPO N10 respectively.

IROC-Zs with the TPI 350 had the 2.77 rear axle ratio as in the previous year, but the optional RPO G92 Performance Axle package modified the ratio to 3.27 for the TPI 350, and 3.45 for the TPI 305 with manual transmission. RPO G92 also included the aforementioned dual-converter exhaust; 4-wheel disc brakes (RPO J65); engine oil cooler; P245/50ZR16 Goodyear Eagle unidirectional tires; a  speedometer; and a tachometer with a 5,500 rpm redline. A total of 1,426 IROC-Z coupes were equipped with the Performance Axle package in 1989.

To take an IROC-Z coupe to the maximum performance extreme in 1989, when the G92 Performance Axle was ordered with no air conditioning (C41), RPO code 1LE was automatically triggered. This included extra equipment intended to make the IROC-Z more competitive in SCCA Showroom Stock road racing events: larger  rotors with 2-piston aluminum calipers from PBR; an aluminum driveshaft; a special baffled fuel tank; specific shock absorbers; and stiffer suspension bushings. The fog lamps were also deleted. The 1LE was simply an option combination, not a separate package or model that dealers were aware of the existence of, resulting in 111 cars built with 1LE equipment in 1989.

1990 

The 1990 model year finished the lowest production to date (35,048), due to a truncated 1990 model run followed by the early introduction of the facelifted 1991 models. 1990 also marked the final year for the IROC-Z; Chevrolet had decided not to renew its contract with the International Race of Champions.

This year was the first year for an airbag to be offered in any F-body. The new airbag came along with a new "half-moon" gauge cluster, that was offered only in 1990–1992 Camaros. The sharp edges on the dash surfaces were rounded and the lettering on gauges switched to yellow from white. 1990 was a distinguishable model year as it was the only third-generation Camaro that did not feature the updated ground effects of the 1991–1992 models but did have the newer interior/dash features. The 2.8 L V6 was upgraded to the 3.1 L V6.

The RPO code 1LE was again available in 1990, triggered as in the previous year by RPO G92 Performance Axle combined with no air conditioning on the IROC-Z coupe. Only 62 Camaros were built with 1LE equipment in 1990.

The Last 1990 Camaro Rolled off the line on December 31, 1989.

Camaros in IROC-Z trim that were equipped with the 5.7 TPI Motor received a slight horsepower increase to 245 at 4,400 rpm and torque numbers also rose to 345 at 3,200 rpm.

1991 

Production for the 1991 Camaro started in February 1990. Big changes occurred, as all Camaros received a facelift in the form of a ground effects package for not only RS but also the Z28 models, while the IROC-Z was no longer offered. The Z28 also featured a high rise spoiler and non-functional hood "blisters". The CHMSL was relocated from the spoiler to the top of the Hatch again like the 1986 models, except the housing was now on the inside rather than the outside of the hatch. The Convertible still retained the spoiler mounted 3rd brake light. The 1991 Z28 also received a new wheel design to accent the new body. The B4C "Special Service" option was made available to law enforcement, the government, and military agencies. The B4C amounted to little more than a Z28 powertrain and suspension in the RS. (Car Craft Magazine refers to the B4C as a 1LE equipped with air conditioning; although this is slightly erroneous because in 1991, the large brakes with PBR calipers from the 1LE package were not included with B4C.) Just under 600 B4C Camaros were sold for 1991. Power rating on the 305 TBI stayed same at 170 hp(127 kW) at 4,000 rpm and 255 lb⋅ft (346 N⋅m) at 2,400 rpm. Rumors say that these numbers were slightly underrated by GM, but this has not been investigated.

Beginning with the 1991 model year, GM pioneered some modified assembly techniques with the F-body Camaro and Firebird which were carried forward into the fourth generation. Different seam sealers, structural adhesives, and body assembly techniques were employed in key areas in an effort to reduce squeaks and rattles and improve the perception of quality.

The SCCA Showroom-Stock-ready 1LE package continued with similar equipment to previous years and was again triggered automatically by the G92 Performance Axle option combined with the C41 basic ventilation system (no air conditioning) on the Z28 coupe. Production of the 1LE increased to 478 units.

1992 

1992 was the final year of the third generation Camaro. A "25th Anniversary Heritage Edition" option had been planned with Corvette aluminum cylinder heads, tubular exhaust headers, and 6-speed manual transmission, but this was scrapped in favor of a "Heritage Package" option (RPO Z03) which amounted to nothing more than a graphics package of badges and rally stripes. All 1992 Camaros received a "25th Anniversary" badge on the dashboard. The 1992 version of the Camaro B4C (Special Service Package) got the addition of 1LE brakes. A total of 589 B4Cs were sold. The B4C option was also deemed popular enough to be carried on to the fourth-generation model.

Some TPI 1992 Camaros received some of the "leftovers" from its Corvette cousin, which switched from Tuned Port Injection to the new LT1 engine series in 1992. They received the rough texture, cast aluminum style, intake runners from the TPI Corvette instead of the regular Camaro smooth tube ones. In some cases, they were built with black painted valve covers instead of the normal silver valve covers. Some also received a blank throttlebody plate, like the LT1, instead of the normal plate with "Tuned Port Injection" script. The change was purely cosmetic, performance remained identical to the previous year.

The RPO 1LE option combination, identical to the previous year in specification and option requirements, had its highest production year of the third generation Camaro, with 705 cars so equipped. As mentioned, the 1LE brakes were included with B4C in 1992, accounting for 589 of the 705 built. This means that only 116 "true" 1LE-only cars (A/C delete, non-Special Service Package) were built for the year.

The vast majority of the 1LE cars built during the 1989-1992 period were very sparsely equipped vehicles. Since they were intended for racing, where extra weight is a disadvantage and interiors are often gutted after purchase, most were very lightly optioned. The majority of 1LE Camaros had the base interior, with no power options, cruise control, or even floor mats. Some were even built without radios (201 cars were built as "radio delete" in 1992).

This was also the last year of production of the Camaro at the assembly plant in Van Nuys, California (and the United States as a whole until 2015). The last third-generation Camaro produced was a red Z28 coupe on August 27, 1992, that features signatures of the assembly line workers.

Engines 
 1982–1985: 2.5 L (151 cid) LQ8 / LQ9 Iron Duke I4
 1982–1984: 2.8 L (173 cid) LC1 V6
 1985–1989: 2.8 L (173 cid) LB8 V6
 1990–1992: 3.1 L (191 cid) LH0 V6
 1982–1983: 5.0 L (305 cid) LU5 Small-Block V8
 1982–1987: 5.0 L (305 cid) LG4 Small-Block V8
 1983–1986: 5.0 L (305 cid) L69 Small-Block V8
 1988–1992: 5.0 L (305 cid) L03 Small-Block V8
 1985–1992: 5.0 L (305 cid) LB9 Small-Block V8
 1987–1992: 5.7 L (350 cid) L98 Small-Block V8

Production 
Production Figures:

References

External links 

 

Chevrolet Camaro 3
Camaro 3
Chevrolet Camaro 3
Chevrolet Camaro 3
Chevrolet Camaro 3
Chevrolet Camaro 3
Cars introduced in 1981
Cars discontinued in 1992